Nikola Terzić (Serbian Cyrillic: Никола Терзић; born 28 September 2000) is a Serbian footballer who plays as a midfielder for Bandırmaspor in the TFF First League.

Career

IMT
In July 2019, Terzić was loaned out to Serbian League Belgrade club IMT. After the club gained promotion in the 2019-20 season, he made his professional debut on 16 August 2020 in a 2-0 defeat to Radnički Sremska Mitrovica. Two weeks later, he scored his first professional goal as part of a brace in a 3-0 victory against Dinamo Vranje.

Partizan
In February 2021, Terzić rejected contract talks with previous club Čukarički. Shortly thereafter, he signed a four year deal with Partizan.

Honours
Individual
Serbian Cup Top goalscorer: 2020–21

References

External links

2000 births
Living people
Sportspeople from Jagodina
FK Čukarički players
FK IMT players
FK Partizan players
Serbian First League players
Serbian footballers
Serbia youth international footballers
Serbia under-21 international footballers
Association football midfielders
Association football wingers